Roxana del Consuelo Sáizar Guerrero (born 1961 in Acaponeta, Nayarit, Mexico), is an editor and publisher, former CEO of Fondo de Cultura Económica (2002-2009), President of the National Council for Culture and the Arts (CONACULTA) (2009-2012) and President of the Regional Center for the Promotion of Books in Latin America and the Caribbean (Cerlalc) (2010-2012). She began her career working in the family printing business at her home state of Nayarit. After graduating with a degree in Communications in 1983, she began to manage editorial departments and publishing houses until 2002, when she was appointed director of government-owned Fondo de Cultura Económica, which is considered the largest publishing house in Latin America. She restructured the organization and started its electronic publishing program. In 2009, she was named President of CONACULTA, an institution devoted to promoting Mexican culture both domestically and abroad, that has since been transformed into the National Ministry of Culture.

Life

Sáizar was born in Acaponeta, Nayarit, Mexico in 1961. She often jokes that in her small hometown most girls think about becoming hairdressers or read poetry. In her case, she was born into a family related to print media. Her grandfather owned a print shop and a newspaper he founded in 1917. Her father then inherited the newspaper.

She began working on the family business when she was young, then decided to make a professional career of that. She received a bachelor's degree in Communications from Universidad Iberoamericana in 1983. She continued studying accounting, public administration and finance, receiving certificates from this university as well as from the Instituto Tecnológico Autónomo de México. She also studied publishing in Great Britain.

She has had personal and professional relationships with a number of important writers and intellectuals, including Juan Rulfo, Jorge Luis Borges, Octavio Paz, Gabriel García Márquez, José Emilio Pacheco and Carlos Monsiváis . She has stated that her most precious possession is a copy of The Aleph autographed by Jorge Luis Borges.

Career

Publishing
Her professional life has been devoted to book publishing. From 1978 to 1979, she was also a reporter and writer in Nayarit for El Observador in Tepic and El Heraldo de México in Mexico City .

She was an external consultant with Martín Casillas Editores and with Editorial Trillas from 1980 to 1983. She was also production manager and department coordinator for Editorial Terranova in 1982.

In 1983, she was recruited by Juan Landereche Obregón, owner of Editorial Jus, who acted as her mentor. She remained with the company as general manager until 1990.  From 1988 to 1989, she was also a contributor to the newspaper La Jornada as well as a press consultant for the Fondo Nacional para Actividades Sociales.

In 1990, she created her own publishing company, Hoja Casa Editorial, with partner Gerardo Gally. She directed the company until 2002.

She was elections advisor (consejera electoral) for Mexico City in 1997 and is a member of the Consejo Asesor de Causa Ciudadana.

In 2000, the Mexican Book Chamber (Caniem) awarded her its Editorial Art Prize.

Fondo de Cultura Económica
In 2002, Sáizar was named the first female director of the Fondo de Cultura Económica (FCE), one of the most prestigious publishers in Spanish, created in 1934 by Daniel Cosío Villegas . She was named head of the FCE after the head of the Secretaría de Educación Pública removed her predecessor, Gonzalo Celorio, without explanation. Sáizar was not part of the controversy. She remained in the position until 2009.

When she took over the FCE she worked to enhance the number of writers published by FCE. While head of the FCE, she created new collections, such as "Obra Reunida", that included works by authors such as Carlos Fuentes, Sergio Pitol, Elena Poniatowska, among others. She also completed publication of Octavio Paz's complete works.

She began to restructure the institution to increase its production and reach. She opened FCE bookstores in Mexico City, most notably the Centro Cultural Bella Época, in various Mexican states and even abroad, such as the Centro Cultural Gabriel García Márquez in 2008 in Bogota, Colombia. FCE books continued to be sold through affiliates in Peru, Guatemala, Venezuela, Brazil, Spain, Chile, the United States of America and Colombia.

Book production under her tenure increased from 1.2 million copies to almost five million copies per year. The FCE also obtained ISO 9001-2000 certification for its distribution facilities, publishing, library and bookstores. While most government cultural institutions run at a deficit, the FCE was the only one to see an increase in income during her term, as well as an expansion of its infrastructure and operations abroad.

At FCE she also established a digital library initiative to generate electronic versions of the company's back catalogue.

CONACULTA
In 2009, she was appointed at the helm of the Consejo Nacional para la Cultura y las Artes (National Council for Culture and the Arts), where she promoted Mexican culture both locally and abroad, noting that the country hosts the largest book festival in Spanish, the Feria Internacional del Libro in Guadalajara; the third largest international art festival, the Festival Internacional Cervantino, and one of the largest and most visited film repositories in the world, the Cineteca Nacional.

From 2007 to 2012, government support of film projects increased from 1,772 million pesos to 6,260 million pesos: 418 films were made during this period. CONACULTA acquired the personal libraries of writers José Luis Martínez Rodríguez, Carlos Monsiváis, Jaime García Terrés, Antonio Castro Leal and Alí Chumacero to be housed at La Ciudadela's historical compound in Mexico City. Art acquisitions for the museums administered by the Instituto Nacional de Bellas Artes totalled 145 million pesos from 2008 to 2011. In 2011, she began a project to work on the digitalizations of Mexico's archives of images, texts and sounds.  There have also been renovations to the Ciudadela library facility, the Estudios Churubusco, the Siqueiros Workshop in Cuernavaca and the Tamayo Museum in Mexico City .

Her tenure was criticized as lacking definition. The main challenge during her tenure was the celebration of Mexico's Bicentennial of its Independence and Centennial of the Mexican Revolution, both of which occurred in 2010. She later recognized that 2010 was “a very difficult year” for her and CONACULTA, with work related to the Bicentennial such as the renovation of the Palacio de Bellas Artes . There was also a proposal to create a film museum called the Museo del Cine, but this project was put on hold. One her last achievements at CONCACULTA was the opening of the Elena Garro Cultural Center in Coyoacán, Mexico City, which has been highly praised.

Other work and recognitions
In 2010, she was named Chairperson of the Centro Regional para el Fomento del Libro para América Latina y el Caribe's Executive Committee (Regional Center for Book Promotion in Latin America and the Caribbean), in Bogotá Colombia. She held this post from 2010 to 2012.
Her recognitions include the Order of Civil Merit from the government of Spain in 2003, and the Emilia Ortiz Medal from the state of Nayarit in 2008. In 2010, Colombia's Ministry of Culture awarded her the Medal of Cultural Merit. In 2011 she received the Bernardo O'Higgins Order from the government of Chile, and in 2017 she was awarded the Order of Victory of the Republic by Mexico's Defence Ministry, the Academia Nacional and the Academia Nacional de Historia y Geografía.

She is co author of the book Gritos y Susurros edited by Denise Dresser., and has published
‘Alfonso Reyes y los libros’. Revista de Humanidades, 2006; ‘Bibliotecas personales: la primera gran hazaña cultural del siglo XXI mexicano’. Premio Internacional Carlos Fuentes a la Creación Literaria en el Idioma Español: Mario Vargas Llosa. México: CONACULTA, 2012; ‘La cartografía de la memoria: bibliotecas digitales’. Dossier. Revista de la Facultad de Comunicación y Letras, Universidad Diego Portales, Santiago de Chile. ‘La persistencia de la biblioteca’; ‘Cultura: aparato institucional y estructura sectorial’, in Eduardo Cruz Vázquez and Carlos A. Lara (eds.). 1988-2012 Cultura y transición. Mexico: UANL, Instituto de Cultura de Morelos, 2012.

References

Living people
Mexican journalists
Mexican women journalists
1961 births
Mexican editors
Mexican women editors